Burleson is a city in Johnson and Tarrant counties in the U.S. state of Texas. It is a suburb of Fort Worth. As of the 2010 census it had a population of 36,690, and in 2019 it had an estimated population of 48,225.

History
The Missouri–Kansas–Texas Railroad, known as "the Katy", extended its service from Denison to Waco. In 1880 the segment from Fort Worth to Alvarado was being laid out, and a midway depot was needed. Grenville M. Dodge, representing the railroad, purchased land for the depot and a town surrounding it from Rev. Henry C. Renfro at the site of what is now called "Old Town" Burleson. As part of the agreement, Renfro named the town "Burleson", in honor of his teacher Rufus Columbus Burleson, the president of Baylor University. The first lot was sold on October 10, 1880, the date now considered the city's "founding day".

The Burleson Post Office opened in 1882, inside a retail establishment, as was common for small towns at the time. On February 20, 1895, a fire burned down most of the business district, along with several houses. One of the Katy workers, J. C. Jones, had stayed in Burleson and opened a water works for the town, drilling a deep well that provided dozens of hydrants for the residents, but they were not sufficient to extinguish the fire. By the end of the 1800s, Burleson was a bustling rural town, with farms all around, schools, a grocery store, cotton gins and grist mills, a general store, a druggist, a bank, and a jeweler. In 1899, a group of nine women formed a society for cultural advancement and called it the Eumathian Club. The women acquired books, loaned them, and held readings, discussions, and music recitals.

In 1909 the Texas Legislature passed a bill forming the Burleson Independent School District. Construction began in 1912 of the Northern Texas Traction Company interurban line between Fort Worth and Cleburne, with Burleson as a stop along the way. The first day of service was September 1, 1912, with 1,200 passengers on the ten passenger runs that day. Two freight runs per day were made as well. The interurban line provided for the first time two very important things to Burleson: easy access to Fort Worth and Cleburne, and electricity. The interurban station was operated out of a drugstore, whose proprietor became ticket master, and who served travelers pastries and soda from the soda fountain. The old drugstore/station still exists, as the Burleson Heritage Museum at the Burleson Visitor's Center, as do two of the interurban cars.

That year, a petition was sent to a Johnson County judge proposing to incorporate the "Town of Burleson", including a survey of the town limits that included most of the original town as set out by Grenville Dodge. An election was held, the petition passed, and the county judge ordered it so. On May 21, 1912, Burleson was incorporated.

The 1920 census showed the population of Burleson to be 241. In 1930 the population was 591. Due to the increasing popularity of automobiles, combined with the Great Depression, the interurban line closed in 1931. In 1940 the population decreased to 573, as people had left Burleson during the depression to find jobs wherever they could. In 1950 the population was 791, and grew to 2,345 in 1960, perhaps partly due to the opening of Interstate 35 through the town that year. By 1970 the population was 7,713, by 1980 11,734. In 1990 the population of Burleson was 16,113. In 2000 the population had grown to 20,976, and in 2010 there were 36,690 people in Burleson.

Geography

Most of Burleson is in northern Johnson County, with a small portion extending north into Tarrant County. The city is bordered to the north by the cities of Crowley and Fort Worth, and to the southwest by the city of Joshua. The Burleson city limits extend southeast from the city center  in a narrow corridor toward Alvarado along Interstate 35W. I-35W leads north  to the center of Fort Worth and south  to Hillsboro. Texas State Highway 174 begins at I-35W in the northern part of Burleson and runs southwest  to Cleburne, the Johnson county seat.

Village Creek, a tributary of the Trinity River, flows to the northeast through the city.

Climate
The climate is characterized by hot, humid summers and generally mild to cool winters. According to the Köppen Climate Classification system, Burleson has a humid subtropical climate, abbreviated "Cfa" on climate maps.

Demographics

2020 census

As of the 2020 United States census, there were 47,641 people, 15,979 households, and 12,330 families residing in the city.

2010 census
As of the 2010 census, there were 36,696 people and 14,018 households. The population density was 1,410.8 inhabitants per square mile. The racial makeup of the city was 90.6% White (83.2% Non-Hispanic), 2.3% African American, 1.1% Asian, and 2.2% from two or more races. Hispanic or Latino of any race were 11.5% of the population.

2000 census
As of the 2000 census, there were 20,977 people, 7,610 households, and 5,981 families residing in the city. The population density was 1,067.7 inhabitants per square mile (412.2/km). There were 7,794 housing units at an average density of 396.7 per square mile (153.1/km). The racial makeup of the city was 95.62% White, 0.40% African American, 0.52% Native American, 0.53% Asian, 0.05% Pacific Islander, 1.46% from other races, and 1.42% from two or more races. Hispanic or Latino of any race were 5.41% of the population.

There were 7,610 households, of which 41.3% had children under the age of 18 living with them, 64.0% were married couples living together, 11.2% had a female householder with no husband present, and 21.4% are classified as non-families according to the United States Census Bureau. Of 7,610 households, 287 are unmarried partner households: 238 heterosexual, 23 same-sex male, and 26 same-sex female households.

18.3% of all households were made up of individuals, and 7.3% had someone living alone who was 65 years of age or older. The average household size was 2.74 and the average family size was 3.11.

The age distribution of the city is 29.1% under the age of 18, 7.8% from 18 to 24, 31.9% from 25 to 44, 21.1% from 45 to 64, and 10.1% who were 65 years of age or older. The median age was 34 years. For every 100 females, there were 94.4 males. For every 100 females age 18 and over, there were 89.0 males.

The median income for a household in the city was $50,432, and the median income for a family was $56,031. Males had a median income of $40,567 versus $27,032 for females. The per capita income for the city was $20,175. About 4.9% of families and 6.0% of the population were below the poverty line, including 6.5% of those under age 18 and 9.6% of those age 65 or over.

Economy
The average household income is $69,000. There are 1,300 businesses in Burleson which employ a total of 10,500 people.

Top employers
According to Burleson's 2014 Comprehensive Annual Financial Report, the top employers in the city are:

Education
Burleson is served primarily by the Burleson Independent School District (BISD), the Joshua Independent School District (JISD), the Everman Independent School District (EISD), and a small part of the Mansfield Independent School District (MISD).

BISD high schools include Burleson High School, Burleson Centennial High School, Game Development Design School (formerly REALM), and Burleson Collegiate High School.

The Burleson Higher Education Center provides a local campus for Hill College and Texas Tech University.

Infrastructure

Airport
Fort Worth Spinks Airport is located on the northern edge of the Burleson city limits.

Notable people
 Robert B. Anderson, former Secretary of the Treasury, Deputy Secretary of Defense, and Secretary of the Navy in the Eisenhower administration
 Kelly Clarkson, Grammy and Emmy Award-winning pop rock, singer-songwriter, talk show host, and American Idol Season 1 winner
 Casey Donahew, Texas country singer songwriter; Casey Donahew Band
 Ethan Couch, criminal known for receiving a light sentence after being convicted of 4 counts of intoxicated manslaughter due to his "affluenza" defense
 Stacy Sykora, United States women's national volleyball team player 1999–2010

References

External links
 City of Burleson official website

Dallas–Fort Worth metroplex
Cities in Texas
Cities in Johnson County, Texas
Cities in Tarrant County, Texas